The Muzuri مزووری; also spelled Mezuri, Missouri, Missuri, Musri, Mzuri or Mzwri) are a Kurdish tribal group inhabiting the northernmost areas of Iraqi Kurdistan. They live to the west of Margavar and (west of Lake Urmia). Muzuri is one of the oldest Kurdish tribes in Kurdistan. Muzuri tribe mentioned by Evliya Çelebi in his travelogue called the Seyahatname ("Book of Travel") in 1638, and mentioned by Mark Sykes in 1909, Also mentioned by the Kurdish historian Zaki in his book (Kurd and Kurdistan) in 1931. Mostly settled in Erbil  and Dohuk provinces. Pendro is one of the largest villages inhabited by the Muzuri clan.

References

Kurdish tribes